The first All-Star Game was held as part of the 1933 World's Fair at Comiskey Park and was the brainchild of Arch Ward, then sports editor for the Chicago Tribune. Initially intended to be a one-time event, its great success resulted in making the game an annual event, with some years (1959–1962) having two All-Star Games.

Venue selection
The venue for each All-Star Game is chosen by an MLB selection committee. This choice may be made to commemorate a particular historical occasion, the opening of a new ballpark, or a significant milestone. The criteria for choosing the venue are subjective; for the most part, cities with new parks and cities who have not hosted the game in a long time or ever tend to be favored. The venues among the major league franchises: between 1964 and 2015, five teams hosted three times, 13 teams twice, ten teams once, and two teams not at all. The "home team" is the league in which the host franchise plays its games. Through the 2022 season, the American League has hosted 45 times, and the National League has hosted 47 times. Traditionally, the game alternates between the two leagues from year to year with six exceptions:

 1950–1951 (American League)
 1952–1953 (National League)
 1959 both games (National League)
 1960 both games (American League)
 1961 second game – 1962 (American League)
 2006–2007 (National League)

This tradition was discontinued after the 2015 game.

As of 2022, one Major League Baseball franchise has never hosted an All-Star Game: the Tampa Bay Rays. The Miami Marlins hosted for the first time in 2017 following the 2012 opening of Marlins Park, although Miami was initially scheduled to host in 2000, MLB eventually moved the game to Atlanta. All-Star games have been played in D.C., hosted by both incarnations of the Washington Senators (now known as the Minnesota Twins and as the Texas Rangers), as well as by the Washington Nationals in 2018.

Of the remaining 27 franchises, the New York Mets had gone the longest period without hosting since their sole hosting duty in 1964, but this streak came to an end at 49 years in 2013. During that span, 18 of the remaining 25 teams have hosted an All-Star Game at least twice since 1964: Atlanta Braves (1972, 2000) Chicago White Sox (1983 and 2003), Cincinnati Reds (1970, 1988, and 2015), Cleveland Indians (1981, 1997, 2019), Detroit Tigers (1971 and 2005), Houston Astros (1968, 1986, and 2004), Kansas City Royals (1973 and 2012), Los Angeles Angels (1967, 1989, and 2010), Milwaukee Brewers (1975 and 2002), Minnesota Twins (1965, 1985, and 2014), New York Yankees (1977 and 2008), Philadelphia Phillies (1976 and 1996), Pittsburgh Pirates (1974, 1994, and 2006), San Diego Padres (1978, 1992, and 2016), San Francisco Giants (1984 and 2007), Seattle Mariners (1979 and 2001), St. Louis Cardinals (1966 and 2009), and Washington Senators/Texas Rangers (1969 and 1995). The Oakland Athletics are now the team with the longest active hosting drought; they have not hosted since 1987.

New stadiums that have not hosted the All-Star Game in cities that have hosted it previously are: Citizens Bank Park in Philadelphia, the new Yankee Stadium in New York City, Truist Park in Atlanta, and Globe Life Field in Arlington. Truist Park was to host the 2021 game, but lost it in response to the passage of the Georgia Election Integrity Act of 2021.

Future All-Star Games will be played at T-Mobile Park in 2023, at Globe Life Field in 2024 and at the aforementioned Citizens Bank Park in 2026, with Philadelphia selected well in advance as a part of the United States Semiquincentennial celebration.

Following the game at the first Yankee Stadium in 2008 in its final season, the Bronx's old stadium joined Cleveland's old Cleveland Stadium (also known as Municipal Stadium prior to its own demolition) as the only venues that have hosted four Major League Baseball All-Star games. New York City has hosted it more than any other city, having done so nine times in five different stadiums; as of 2022, Tampa Bay remains the only major league metropolitan area since the first All-Star Game in 1933 to never have hosted.

List of hosts

Record of host league

Record of home league

Various statistics

Times hosted by city

Times hosted by club

The Tampa Bay Rays have yet to host the All-Star Game.

Ballparks that have hosted more than one All-Star Game

Active baseball parks
Wrigley Field 1947, 1962, 1990
Fenway Park 1946, 1961, 1999
Angel Stadium 1967, 1989, 2010
Kauffman Stadium 1973, 2012
Progressive Field 1997, 2019
Coors Field 1998, 2021
Dodger Stadium 1980, 2022
T-Mobile Park 2001, 2023
Globe Life Field 2024

Discontinued baseball parks
Yankee Stadium 1939, 1960, 1977, 2008
Cleveland Stadium 1935, 1954, 1963, 1981
Sportsman's Park 1940, 1948, 1957
Tiger Stadium 1941, 1951, 1971
Comiskey Park 1933, 1950, 1983
Polo Grounds 1934, 1942
Shibe Park 1943, 1952
Crosley Field 1938, 1953
Griffith Stadium 1937, 1956
Forbes Field 1944, 1959
Robert F. Kennedy Memorial Stadium 1962, 1969
Milwaukee County Stadium 1955, 1975
Candlestick Park 1961, 1984
Houston Astrodome 1968, 1986
Riverfront Stadium 1970, 1988
Jack Murphy Stadium 1978, 1992
Three Rivers Stadium 1974, 1994
Veterans Stadium 1976, 1996

The only discontinued ballparks that hosted one All-Star Game are: Ebbets Field in 1949, Memorial Stadium in 1958, Los Angeles Memorial Coliseum in 1959, Shea Stadium in 1964, Metropolitan Stadium in 1965, Busch Memorial Stadium in 1966, Atlanta–Fulton County Stadium in 1972, the Kingdome in 1979, Olympic Stadium (Montreal) in 1982, Hubert H. Humphrey Metrodome in 1985, Globe Life Park in Arlington in 1995, and Turner Field in 2000.

Ballparks that have never hosted an All-Star Game

Active baseball parks (oldest parks listed first)
Tropicana Field, opened in 1990; the Rays have played there since 1998.
Citizens Bank Park, opened in 2004; the Phillies last hosted the ASG in 1996 in Veterans Stadium (planned to host in 2026, to celebrate the 250th anniversary of the signing of the United States Declaration of Independence).
Yankee Stadium, opened in 2009; the Yankees last hosted the ASG in 2008 at the original Yankee Stadium.
Truist Park, opened in 2017; the Braves last hosted the ASG in 2000 at Turner Field. (Was set to host 2021 All-Star Game, but the game was moved to Denver as a result of Georgia passing a controversial voting rights bill.)
Globe Life Field, opened in 2020; the Rangers last hosted the ASG in 1995 at Globe Life Park (planned to host in 2024).

Discontinued baseball parks (oldest parks listed first)
Baker Bowl, the Phillies played there from 1895 to 1938 (the All-Star game began in 1933)
League Park, the Indians split games between League Park and Cleveland Stadium off and on until the end of the 1946 season
Seals Stadium, the Giants played there from 1958 to 1959 *
Wrigley Field of Los Angeles, the Angels played there in 1961 *
Colt Stadium, the Colt .45s (now the Astros) played there from 1962 to 1964 *
Sick's Stadium, the Pilots played there in 1969 *
Jarry Park, the Expos played there from 1969 to 1976 *
Arlington Stadium, the Rangers played there from 1972 to 1993
Exhibition Stadium, the Blue Jays played there from 1977 to 1989
Mile High Stadium, the Rockies played there from 1993 to 1994 *
Sun Life Stadium, the Marlins played there from 1993 to 2011
A * indicates that the stadium was a temporary facility, used in the short term by a team awaiting the construction of a larger, permanent home park.

The last time each franchise has hosted an All-Star Game
from least recent to most recent

Oakland Athletics, 1987
Chicago Cubs, 1990
Toronto Blue Jays, 1991
Baltimore Orioles, 1993
Texas Rangers, 1995 (will host the 2024 All-Star Game)
Philadelphia Phillies, 1996 (will host the 2026 All-Star Game)
Tampa Bay Rays, never (Franchise started in 1998)
Boston Red Sox, 1999
Atlanta Braves, 2000
Seattle Mariners, 2001 (will host the 2023 All-Star Game)
Milwaukee Brewers, 2002
Chicago White Sox, 2003
Houston Astros, 2004
Detroit Tigers, 2005
Pittsburgh Pirates, 2006
San Francisco Giants, 2007
New York Yankees, 2008
St. Louis Cardinals, 2009
Los Angeles Angels, 2010
Arizona Diamondbacks, 2011
Kansas City Royals, 2012
New York Mets, 2013
Minnesota Twins, 2014
Cincinnati Reds, 2015
San Diego Padres, 2016
Miami Marlins, 2017
Washington Nationals, 2018
Cleveland Guardians, 2019 

Colorado Rockies, 2021
Los Angeles Dodgers, 2022

Hosting All-Star Game and post-season games in same season
The following teams have hosted the All-Star Game in the summer then proceeded to host post-season games in the fall:

1939: New York Yankees – won World Series
1946: Boston Red Sox – lost World Series
1949: Brooklyn Dodgers – lost World Series
1954: Cleveland Indians – lost World Series
1959: (Game 2): Los Angeles Dodgers – won World Series
1960: (Game 2): New York Yankees – lost World Series
1965: Minnesota Twins – lost World Series

League Championship Series play began 1969

1970: Cincinnati Reds – lost World Series – also first season for Riverfront Stadium
1974: Pittsburgh Pirates – lost NLCS
1976: Philadelphia Phillies – lost NLCS
1977: New York Yankees – won World Series
1983: Chicago White Sox – lost ALCS
1986: Houston Astros – lost NLCS
1991: Toronto Blue Jays – lost ALCS

Division Series play began 1995

1997: Cleveland Indians – lost World Series
1999: Boston Red Sox – lost ALCS
2000: Atlanta Braves – lost NLDS
2001: Seattle Mariners – lost ALCS
2004: Houston Astros – lost NLCS
2009: St. Louis Cardinals – lost NLDS
2011: Arizona Diamondbacks – lost NLDS

Notes

References

Venues
All-Star Game venues
All-Star Game venues
Major League Baseball All-Star Game